Gena is a tiny crater on the Moon. It is near the site where Soviet lunar rover Lunokhod 1 landed in November 1970, in the Mare Imbrium region. Its diameter is 0.2 km. The name Gena does not refer to a specific person; it is a male name of Russian origin, a diminutive form of Gennady.

References

External links

Gena at The Moon Wiki
 
 

Impact craters on the Moon
Mare Imbrium